Sarvis Fork Covered Bridge, also known as Sandyville Covered Bridge, is a historic covered bridge located near Sandyville, Jackson County, West Virginia. It was built in 1889-1890 for $64.00 by R.B. Cunningham and G.W. Staats in 1890, originally spanning John Carnahan's Fork, a branch of Mill Creek.  When US Route 33 was built using an iron bridge, the covered bridge was first abandoned, then moved and rebuilt over the Left Fork of the Sandy Creek in 1924 for $1,050.00.

The bridge was completely rebuilt in 2000 at a cost of $598,233 by R.C. Construction Company & Sons, Inc. of Cutler, Ohio.

It measures 101 feet 3 1/2 inches in length and 11 feet 8 inches wide.

It was listed on the National Register of Historic Places in 1981.

References

See also
List of covered bridges in West Virginia

Covered bridges on the National Register of Historic Places in West Virginia
Bridges completed in 1889
Buildings and structures in Jackson County, West Virginia
National Register of Historic Places in Jackson County, West Virginia
Road bridges on the National Register of Historic Places in West Virginia
Wooden bridges in West Virginia
Long truss bridges in the United States
Rebuilt buildings and structures in West Virginia